Garma Electric is an Iranian engineering, procurement and construction company. The main field of Garma Electric work is design, construction and procurement of agricultural machinery and food industries.the company is located in Amol, Iran.

Founding
The company was founded on 25 November 2003 and opened with five employees. Garma Electric starts producing with Feed and Turn Dryers.

Fields of Activity
Pellet Mill machines
Feed Production Lines
Poultry equipment
Agricultural Machinery
Food industries, Driers
Hammer Mills
Heater
Cooler
Ventilation Fan
Fish Powder Production Lines

References

Engineering companies of Iran